Oleksandr Tsybulnyk (born 9 January 1993) is a Ukrainian professional footballer who plays as a midfielder for Odra Wodzisław Śląski.

References

External links 
 
 

1993 births
Living people
Footballers from Kharkiv
Ukrainian footballers
Association football midfielders
FC Dynamo Kyiv players
FC Dynamo-2 Kyiv players
FC Cherkashchyna players
Hapoel Nir Ramat HaSharon F.C. players
FC Dnepr Mogilev players
FC Ahrobiznes Volochysk players
FC Kramatorsk players
FC Podillya Khmelnytskyi players
Tomasovia Tomaszów Lubelski players
Odra Wodzisław Śląski players
Ukrainian First League players
Ukrainian Second League players
III liga players
Ukraine youth international footballers
Ukrainian expatriate footballers
Expatriate footballers in Israel
Expatriate footballers in Belarus
Expatriate footballers in Poland
Ukrainian expatriate sportspeople in Belarus
Ukrainian expatriate sportspeople in Israel
Ukrainian expatriate sportspeople in Poland